Scherffelia is a genus of green algae in the family Chlorodendraceae.

The genus was circumscribed by Adolf A. Pascher in Lotos vol.59 on page 341 in 1911.

The genus name of Scherffelia is in honour of Aladár Scherffel (1865–1938), who was a Hungarian botanist (Algology) and mycologist.

Species
As accepted by WoRMS;
 Scherffelia bichlora 
 Scherffelia deformis 
 Scherffelia dubia 
 Scherffelia incisa 
 Scherffelia pelagica 
 Scherffelia phacus 

Former Species; 
 S. opisthostigma  accepted as Scherffelia dubia
 S. ovata  accepted as Scherffelia dubia

References

External links

Chlorophyta genera
Chlorodendrophyceae